Chamavaram is a village in Kakinada district of the Indian state of Andhra Pradesh. It is administered under Tuni Mandal.

Geography 

Chamavaram is located at a distance of 12 km West of Tuni.

Demographics

The total population constitute,  males,  females and  children, in the age group of 0–6 years. The average literacy rate stands at 54.82%, significantly lower than the national average of 73.00%.

References 

Villages in Kakinada district